Eubranchus steinbecki is a species of sea slug or nudibranch, a marine gastropod mollusc in the family Eubranchidae.

Distribution
This species was described from specimens collected from boat floats at Dana Landing, Mission Bay, San Diego,  and intertidally at Palos Verdes, California, United States. It has been reported from Palos Verdes south to La Paz, Baja California Sur, Mexico.

References

Eubranchidae
Gastropods described in 1987